Infante Augusto, Duke of Coimbra (4 November 1847 – 26 September 1889) was a Portuguese infante (prince) of the House of Braganza.

Life 
Augusto Maria Miguel Gabriel Rafael Agrícola Francisco de Assis Gonzaga Pedro de Alcântara Loiola of Saxe-Coburg-Gotha and Bragança was born in Lisbon the fifth son of Queen Maria II of Portugal and her King consort Fernando II. Augusto was created Duke of Coimbra and had the additional title Duke of Saxony through his father. He had the style of His Royal Highness.

In late 1861, three of his brothers the king Pedro V, Infante João, Duke of Beja and Infante Fernando all fell ill and died. Despite falling ill himself he survived and became heir presumptive to another of his brothers and the new king, Luis I on 27 December 1861 following the death of his brother João. He remained heir until 28 September 1863 and the birth of Prince Carlos the son of king Luis.

Augusto had a career in the Portuguese Army and became general of a division. He died in Lisbon  1889. He is buried at the Royal Pantheon of the Braganza Dynasty.

Ancestry

References

1847 births
1889 deaths
People from Lisbon
House of Braganza-Saxe-Coburg and Gotha
103
Portuguese infantes
19th-century Portuguese people
Burials at the Monastery of São Vicente de Fora
2
2
Knights Grand Cross of the Order of the Immaculate Conception of Vila Viçosa
Knights of the Golden Fleece of Spain
Sons of kings